The pulp and paper industry comprises companies that use wood as raw material and produce pulp, paper, paperboard, and other cellulose-based products.

Manufacturing process 
The pulp is fed to a paper machine where it is formed as a paper web and the water is removed from it by pressing and drying.

Pressing the sheet removes the water by force. Once the water is forced from the sheet, a special kind of felt, which is not to be confused with the traditional one, is used to collect the water. Whereas, when making paper by hand, a blotter sheet is used instead.

Drying involves using air or heat to remove water from the paper sheets. In the earliest days of paper making, this was done by hanging the sheets like laundry. In more modern times, various forms of heated drying mechanisms are used. On the paper machine, the most common is the steam heated can dryer.

History of the paper industry

Papermaking as a craft is ancient, and for centuries it used various fibers, mainly grasses (cereal straws and others), or rags from old clothing made from them, in various preindustrial times and places. The commercial planting of domesticated mulberry trees to make pulp for papermaking is attested as early as the 6th century. Due to advances in printing technology, the Chinese paper industry continued to grow under the Song dynasty to meet the rising demand for printed books. Demand for paper was also stimulated by the Song government, which needed a large supply of paper for printing paper money and exchange certificates.

An example of an enterprising paper mill during the late phase of the preindustrial era is the mill by William Rittenhouse and sons at what is now preserved as Historic RittenhouseTown in Pennsylvania. 

The first mechanised paper machine was installed at Frogmore Paper Mill, Apsley, Hertfordshire in 1803, followed by another in 1804. The site operates currently as a museum.

During the 19th and 20th centuries, the paper chemical technologies for making the pulp from wood rather than grasses underwent some major industrial-era upgrades, as first the soda pulping process and then the Kraft process helped reduce the unit cost of paper manufacture. This made paper newly abundant, and along with continual advancements in printing press technologies, as well as in transport technologies (for distribution), during these same centuries, led to greatly increased sales and circulation of newspapers, other periodicals, and books of every kind.

Environmental effects

The pulp and paper industry has been criticized by environmental groups like the Natural Resources Defense Council for unsustainable deforestation and clearcutting of old-growth forest. The industry trend is to expand globally to countries like Russia, China and Indonesia with low wages and low environmental oversight. According to Greenpeace, farmers in Central America illegally rip up vast tracts of native forest for cattle and soybean production without any consequences, and companies who buy timber from private land owners contribute to massive deforestation of the Amazon Rainforest. On the other hand, the situation is quite different where forest growth has been on the increase for a number of years. It is estimated for instance that since 1990 forests have grown in Europe by 17 million hectares, which has been supported through the practice of sustainable forest management by the industry. In Sweden, for every tree that is felled, two are planted.

The pulp and paper industry consumes a significant amount of water and energy and produces wastewater with a high concentration of chemical oxygen demand (COD), among other contaminants. Recent studies underline coagulation as an appropriate pre-treatment of pulp and paper industrial wastewater and as a cost-effective solution for the removal of COD and the reduction of pressures on the aquatic environment.

Current production volumes and sales
The industry is dominated by North American (United States and Canada), northern European (Finland, Sweden, and North-West Russia) and East Asian countries (such as East Siberian Russia, China, Japan, and South Korea). Australasia and Brazil also have significant pulp and paper enterprises. The industry also has a significant presence in a number of European countries including Germany, Portugal, Italy, the Netherlands and Poland. The United States had been the world's leading producer of paper until it was overtaken by China in 2009.

List of main countries by production quantity
According to data from Statista, 
China produced 110 million metric tons in 2018 followed by the US with 72 million.

According to statistic data by RISI, main producing countries of paper and paperboard, not including pulp, in the world are as follows:

List of main company groups by production quantity
The world's main paper and paperboard company groups are as follows. (Some figures are estimates.):

List by net sales
In 2008, the top 10 forest, paper and packaging products companies were, according to a report by PricewaterhouseCoopers:

Manufacturers and suppliers for the industry

Leading manufacturers of capital equipment with over $1 billion in annual revenue for the pulp and paper industry include:

 Valmet
 Bellmer
 Andritz
 Metso
 Voith
Scan Machineries
 Kadant
Statiflo

See also
 American Forest & Paper Association
 List of paper mills
 Converters (industry)
 Pulp and paper industry in Canada
 Pulp and paper industry in Europe
 Confederation of European Paper Industries
 Pulp and paper industry in Japan
 Pulp and paper industry in the United States
 Roll hardness tester
 Wood industry
 Forestry industry
 Environmental impact of paper

References

External links
 Confederation of European Paper Industries
  American Forest & Paper Association (AF&PA) 
 Forest Products Association of Canada (FPAC)

 
Lists of countries by economic indicator
Industries (economics)